Tijani Luqman Opeyemi (born 8 July 1990 Lagos, Nigeria) is a Nigerian professional soccer player at central defender and right back. He has played in the Nigerian Premier League and Turkish leagues. Through 2016, Opeyemi has played 180 matches, scoring 19 goals.

References

1990 births
Living people
Nigerian footballers
Sportspeople from Lagos
Association football defenders
21st-century Nigerian people